Villena is a city in Spain, in the Valencian Community. It is located at the northwest part of Alicante, and borders to the west with Castilla-La Mancha and Murcia, to the north with the province of Valencia and to the east and south with the province of Alicante. It is the capital of the comarca of the Alto Vinalopó. The municipality has an area of 345.6 km² and a population of 34,928 inhabitants as of INE 2008.

There is evidence of settlement in the area from Middle Paleolithic. However, it is on dispute if the current city dates from visigothic times or before, though certainly it existed in the 11th century, during the Muslim period. After the Christian conquest, it became Seigneury, Principality, Duchy and finally Marquisate, until the people, encouraged by the Catholic Monarchs, revolted against the marquis. In 1525 Charles V conceded the title of City to Villena. This is the most economically prosperous period, as shown by the monuments that survived to nowadays. Although a railway station was inaugurated in 1858, economy kept being mainly agricultural until the rural exode that took place in the 1960s. Then, the economic model changed rapidly so that currently economy is based mainly on tertiary sector and industry, chiefly footwear, construction and furniture.

The historical city and surroundings contain an important group of historical remains, including two castles and several churches, hermitages, palaces and squares, as well as a number of museums, standing out the Archaeological Museum "José María Soler". Among the main cultural events are the Moors and Christians festival and the Concurso de Jóvenes Intérpretes "Ruperto Chapí" (Young Interpreters Contest).

Toponymy
The first known name of the area is Ad Turres, which appears in the Vascula Apollinaria and has been identified with some of the Roman villas or postae in the Via Augusta itinerary, at some point between Villena and Font de la Figuera. Near the latter there is evidence of an old Tower already ruined by the 14th century. As for the origin of the term Villena, there is some polemic. Menéndez Pidal proposed an evolution from a hypothetic antroponym Bellius or Vellius and the sufix -ana, as in Lucena (Lucius + -ana) or Maracena (Marcus + -ana), which would give the Roman word Belliana or Velliana. However, Belliana or Bellius have not been documented in Roman times, as well as the evolution from Belliana to Villena involves several phonetic difficulties. So, Domene Verdú indicates that the origin of the toponym would be the term  Bilyāna, purely Arabic, meaning "the filled (by Allah)". This Arabic term, documented from the 11th century on, evolved in two ways. On the one hand, following the rules of Medieval Spanish, to Belliena, as is written in the Historia Roderici (around 1180). On the other hand, Belliena was replaced by the Aragonese term Billena after the Christian conquest, which was carried out mostly by Aragonese and Catalan. The current spelling was consolidated around the 15th century, since Spanish had totally lost the distinction between [b] and [v] and writing was attracted by the word villa, meaning "town".

Symbols
The coat of arms of Villena has been used traditionally since at least 1477, but has never been made official. The castle in the first quarter comes from the symbol of the Crown of Castile, whereas the lion in the second quarter and the winged hand in the third are legacy of don Juan Manuel, second lord of the city. The three pinetrees and the pond in the fourth quarter refer to the Lagoon of Villena or the Fuente del Chopo, formerly big wealth sources for the city; the first as a salt evaporation pond and the second as a source of fresh water. The crown is a symbol of the marquisate of Villena. As the coat of arms has never made official, there are different versions according to the City Hall's terms of office, as well as certain polemic about the position of the second and third quarter.

Physical geography
Villena is placed northwest in the province of Alicante, in the comarca of Alto Vinalopó. It is in the middle of an important crossroad which links the Valencian Community, the Region of Murcia and Castile-La Mancha, in a natural corridor known as Villena's Corridor or Vinalopó's Corridor, since the river Vinalopó flows through the municipal term of Villena. This corridor has been of capital importance since prehistoric times (this is the place where the Via Augusta led first into the Meseta Central), and, being at the middle of towns as Biar, Sax, Font de la Figuera, Yecla or Caudete made Villena an important transports junction. Villena's municipality, having an area of 345,6 km2 in the second widest in the province of Alicante.

History 

Villena region played an important role during the Bronze Age, and in the development of early metallurgy.

Cabezo Redondo is an important archaeological site of the Bronze Age located on a hill 2 km from the town of Villena. It was a regional center inhabited between 1500 and 1100 BC, and probably belonged to Argaric culture.

After the Islamic conquest of the Iberian Peninsula the city was called Medina Bilyana and was one of the seven cities mentioned in the Treaty of Tudmir. Calatrava knights reconquered the city by the king James I of Aragon. This caused some tensions between Castile and Aragon, since Villena should have been reserved to Castile under the treaties of Tudilén and Cazorla, so both crowns had to sign news treaties: The Treaty of Almizra, Torrellas and Elche.

After the Christian conquest, Villena becomes the capital of an important seigneury, later duchy, principality and marquisate, until the popular rebellion against the Marquis, instigated by the Catholic Monarchs.

Ancient gold hoards

The Cabezo Redondo gold hoard was an important archaeological find. It was made by the Spanish archaeologist José María Soler García. The treasure was found in 1959, and contains 35 items of jewelry, including a tiara, finger rings, bracelets, and pendants.

Treasure of Villena, another find that is much bigger, was also hidden in the Cabezo Redondo area, near Villena, by its ancient inhabitants. This was also found, in 1963, by José María Soler García. It is the most important ancient treasure find in the Iberian Peninsula and the second one in Europe, just behind that from the Royal Graves in Mycenae, Greece.

This find was not made at Cabezo Redondo, itself, but at the Rambla del Panadero, 5 km east of Villena. Nevertheless, it is believed that, based on its resemblance to the previous Cabezo Redondo hoard, the trove was buried by the ancient inhabitants of Cabezo Redondo.

Main sights

Castle of la Atalaya, built by the Moors in the 11th century.
Municipal Palace
Saint James Church, a late Gothic Catholic church.
Archaeological Museum. Founded by archaeologist José María Soler García, it contains the Treasure of Villena.

Events
Villena is home to the most crowded festival of Moros y Cristianos in Spain.

It is also home to one of the biggest rock / heavy metal festivals in Spain, Leyendas del Rock, which takes place every August.

Economy
The economy of the city is based on footwear (like in the neighbouring cities of Elda and Novelda), pottery, furnitures and wines.

Sport
Juan Carlos Ferrero, former world no. 1 tennis player has developed the JC Ferrero Equelite Tennis Academy, which has produced such players as Guillermo García-López, and Carlos Alcaraz.

Transport
Villena is located close to Autovía A-31. It has two railway stations; Villena AV serving AVE high-speed rail services on the Madrid–Levante high-speed rail network, and Villena, which sees Renfe local and regional trains.

Famous citizens
José María Soler
Ruperto Chapí, zarzuela composer
Juan Carlos Ferrero, tennis player
Pablo Menor, jesuit priest.
Antonio Navarro Santafé, sculptor.
Carlos Alcaraz, tennis player.

Twin cities
 Escalona, Spain, since 1982, on the occasion of the 700 anniversary of the birth of don Juan Manuel, who was lord of Villena, Escalona and Peñafiel.
  Peñafiel, Spain, since 1982, on the occasion of the 700 anniversary of the birth of don Juan Manuel, who was lord of Villena, Escalona and Peñafiel.

See also
 Revolt of the Brotherhoods
 Seigneury of Villena
 Taifa of Murcia
 Treaty of Almizra
 Treaty of Orihuela
Route of the Castles of Vinalopó
 War of the Castilian Succession
 War of the Two Peters

References

External links

 Ayuntamiento de Villena 
 Archaeological Museum "José María Soler" 
 "Esculptor Navarro Santafé" Museum 
 Moros y Cristianos Festival Central Assembly 
 Kakv, Cultural Center 
 Villena in English 

 
Municipalities in the Province of Alicante
Alto Vinalopó